Leonard J. Wood (July 27, 1865 – April 13, 1957) was a farmer, trader, and political figure on Prince Edward Island, Canada. He represented 3rd Queens in the Legislative Assembly of Prince Edward Island from 1904 to 1908, from 1916 to 1919 and from 1924 to 1927 as a Conservative.

He was born in Mount Herbert, Prince Edward Island, the son of Leonard Wood and Margaret Irving. In 1889, he married Jessie May Stewart. Wood lived in Hopeton. He was defeated when he ran for reelection in 1919. He served in the province's Executive Council as a minister without portfolio.

References 
 

Progressive Conservative Party of Prince Edward Island MLAs
1865 births
1957 deaths
People from Queens County, Prince Edward Island